Neem Ka Thana Assembly constituency is one of constituencies of Rajasthan Legislative Assembly in the Sikar (Lok Sabha constituency).

Neem Ka Thana constituency covers all voters from parts of Neem Ka Thana tehsil, which includes ILRC Neem Ka Thana including Neem Ka Thana Municipal Board, ILRC Patan, ILRC Chala, ILRC Dabla.

References

See also 
 Member of the Legislative Assembly (India)

Sikar district
Assembly constituencies of Rajasthan